Don Thomson Jr. (born August 24, 1962) is a Canadian former racing driver in the NASCAR Canadian Tire Series. He drove the No. 4 Home Hardware Chevrolet Monte Carlo SS for Fitzpatrick Motorsports for more than two decades before moving over in 2011 to the drive the No. 8 Dodge becoming teammates with Jason Hathaway. He retired after the 2011 season after winning multiple championships.

Racing career

Thomson was the 2001 to 2005 champion in the CASCAR Super Series, the premiere stockcar series in Canada picking up many wins. He moved to the NASCAR Canadian Tire Series when CASCAR was purchased by NASCAR in 2007.

He won the first race in the NASCAR Canadian Tire Series history at Cayuga International Speedway on May 26, 2007 as well as Mosport Speedway (2007); SunValley (2008), Riverside (2008). Thomson has 9 poles which include SunValley (2007), Cayuga-2 (2007); Cayuga-1 (2008), Barrie-1 (2008), Saint-Eustache (2008), SunValley (2008), Cayuga-2 (2008), Barrie-2 (2008), Kawartha (2008). He also finished second in points in 2008 finishing 24 points behind Scott Steckly.

In 2009 he picked up one win at Barrie Speedway while in 2010 his performance improved getting one win at Mosport International Raceway.

Motorsports career results

NASCAR
(key) (Bold – Pole position awarded by qualifying time. Italics – Pole position earned by points standings or practice time. * – Most laps led.)

Nationwide Series

References

External links
Driver profile

1962 births
Living people
Racing drivers from Ontario
NASCAR drivers
People from the Regional Municipality of Waterloo
CASCAR Super Series drivers